Petrok Maly, also known as Petrok Maly Fryazin (lit. Peter Junior) (? - ), was an Italian architect, who arrived in Moscow together with the envoys of Pope Clement VII in 1528.

He was likely born Pietro Annibale in Italy, and worked as an architect by the Vatican. He would have lost his secure employment with the Sack of Rome in 1527. There was a demand for builders in Muscovy, and he traveled there with the Pope's support.

His work in Russia includes the 1532 construction of the Ascension Church in Kolomenskoye (the true architect's identity is still contested), one of the earliest Russian churches showing tented roof design. In 1533, Petrok Maly was commissioned to build the so-called Kitai-gorod wall, the construction of which would be finished in 1538. The 2.6-km wall originally featured 12 towers and four gates. 
   

In 1539 turmoil at the royal court after the death of Elena Glinskaya led Maly to flee to Livonia, where he told his story to the Bishop of Dorpat (Tartu).

References

16th-century Italian architects
Architects from Moscow